Hur mycket jag än tar finns alltid lite kvar is a 2006 album from Swedish pop group Raymond & Maria.

Track listing
Dikter på fel sätt
Storstadskvinnor faller ner och dör
Jag läste om någon som stal en bil
Hur andra människor bor
Väntar
Kärlek 1
Du letar i bilen
Någonting på NK
Varför ska vi göra allt igen
Prins Carl Philip

Charts

References

2006 albums